Annexstad is a surname. Notable people with the surname include:

Albert T. Annexstad, American businessman and philanthropist
Stein H. Annexstad (born 1944), Norwegian businessperson and politician

See also
 Annexstad Lake
 Annexstad Peak